Licia Macchini (July 11, 1930 – November 29, 2018) was an artistic gymnast. She competed at the 1948 and 1952 Summer Olympics.

References

1930 births
2018 deaths
Italian female artistic gymnasts
Gymnasts at the 1948 Summer Olympics
Gymnasts at the 1952 Summer Olympics
Olympic gymnasts of Italy
Medalists at the World Artistic Gymnastics Championships